Chinese(-)Dutch or Dutch(-)Chinese may refer to:
People's Republic of China–Netherlands relations (c.f. "a Chinese Dutch treaty")
Chinese people in the Netherlands
Dutch people in China; see also :Category:Dutch expatriates in China
Eurasian (mixed ancestry) people of Chinese and Dutch descent
People with dual citizenship of the Netherlands and the People's Republic of China or the Republic of China

See also
Dutch Indochina, an uncommon alternative name for the Dutch East Indies